The 2003 Belgian Cup Final, took place on 1 June 2003 between La Louvière and Sint-Truiden. It was the 48th Belgian Cup final and was won by La Louvière.

Route to the final

Match

Details

External links
  

Belgian Cup finals
Cup Final